The men's 3000 metres steeplechase at the 2022 World Athletics U20 Championships was held at the Estadio Olímpico Pascual Guerrero in Cali, Colombia on 1 and 4 August 2022.

38 athletes from 26 countries were originally entered to the competition, even though the first published entry list featured 43 athletes from 27 countries.

Records
U20 standing records prior to the 2022 World Athletics U20 Championships were as follows:

Results

Round 1
The round 1 took place on 3 August, with the 38 athletes involved being splitted into 3 heats. The first 3 athletes in each heat ( Q ) and the next 6 fastest ( q ) qualified to the final. The overall results were as follows:

Final
The final was started at 17:01 on 6 August. The results were as follows:

References

Steeplechase 3000 metres men
Steeplechase at the World Athletics U20 Championships